Persatuan Sepakbola Dayan Gunung (simply known as PS Daygun) is an Indonesian football club based in North Lombok Regency, West Nusa Tenggara. They currently compete in the Liga 3 West Nusa Tenggara zone.

References

External links

North Lombok Regency
Football clubs in Indonesia
Football clubs in West Nusa Tenggara
Association football clubs established in 2011
2011 establishments in Indonesia